Euryphura porphyrion, the Porphyry commander, is a butterfly in the family Nymphalidae. It is found in Nigeria, Cameroon, Gabon, the Republic of the Congo and the Democratic Republic of the Congo. The habitat consists of forests.

Subspecies
E. p. porphyrion (Nigeria: Cross River loop, Cameroon)
E. p. congoensis Joicey & Talbot, 1921 (Democratic Republic of the Congo: Uele, Tshopo, Equateur, Sankuru)
E. p. fontainei Hecq, 1990 (Democratic Republic of the Congo: central basin)
E. p. grassei Bernardi, 1965 (Gabon, Congo)

References

Butterflies described in 1871
Limenitidinae
Butterflies of Africa
Taxa named by Christopher Ward (entomologist)